Broome, also known as Rubibi by the Yawuru people, is a coastal pearling and tourist town in the Kimberley region of Western Australia,  north of Perth. It is the largest town in the Kimberley region.

Geography
Broome is located on Western Australia's tropical Kimberley coast on the eastern edge of the Indian Ocean.

Roebuck Bay

Being situated on a north–south peninsula, Broome has water on both sides of the town. On the eastern shore are the waters of Roebuck Bay extending from the main jetty at Port Drive to Sandy Point, west of Thangoo station. Town Beach is part of the shoreline and is popular with visitors on the eastern end of the town. It is the site of the 'Staircase to the Moon', where a receding tide and a rising moon combine to create a stunning natural phenomenon. On "Staircase to the Moon" nights, a food and craft market operates on Town Beach.

Roebuck Bay is of international importance for the millions of migrating waders or shorebirds that use it seasonally on migration through the East Asian – Australasian Flyway from their breeding grounds in northern Asia. They feed on the extensive intertidal mudflats and roost at high tide on the red sand beaches of the bay. They can be seen in the largest numbers in summer, but many of the younger birds remain throughout the first and second years of their lives. The Broome Bird Observatory, sited in pindan woodland close to the northern shore of Roebuck Bay, was established by Birds Australia in 1988, and formally opened in 1990. The purpose of the observatory is to study the birds, learn how to protect them and educate the public about them.

A mixed black flying fox and little red flying fox colony of around 50,000 megabats lives all year in mangroves next to Broome township's small Streeter's Jetty. They chatter and socialise loudly before flying out at dusk each evening. The bats are key pollinators and seed dispersers for native trees and plants.

Cable Beach

Located directly east of Cable Beach over the dunes is Minyirr Park, a coastal reserve administered by a collaboration of the Shire of Broome and the Yawuru people.

History

Yawuru people
Broome is situated on the traditional lands of the Yawuru people.

European settlement
It is often mistakenly thought that the first European to visit Broome was William Dampier in 1688, but he only visited the north of what was later named the Dampier Peninsula. In 1699 he explored the coast from Shark Bay to La Grange Bay, from where he headed north leaving the Australian coast. Many of the coastal features of the area were later named for him. In 1879, Charles Harper proposed the formation of a Government Station at the Roebuck Bay Pastoral and Agricultural Association's site at Cape Villaret, at the south end of Roebuck Bay, to provide facilities for the extension of the Pearl Shell Fishery, and to form a port and base of operations for intending pastoral and agricultural settlers. In 1883, John Forrest chose the site for the town, and it was named after Sir Frederick Broome, the Governor of Western Australia from 1883 to 1889.

The 1880s saw the commencement of Broome's pearling industry, which initially involved slavery and indentured labour, pearl diving being an occupation reserved for specific ethnic groups, most prominently from Japan and followed by other Asian countries. This led to numerous racially motivated conflicts, most notably the 1920 race riots between Japanese and Malay residents, resulting in 8 deaths and at least 60 injuries. The Broome community came to "reflect the hierarchy of the pearling industry, which was based on occupation and ethnicity". White collar occupations and positions of power were exclusively held by Europeans. As a consequence, racial segregation was common in Broome until the 1970s.

In 1889, a telegraph undersea cable was laid from Broome to Banjuwangi, East Java, connecting to England. Hence the name Cable Beach given to the landfall site.

1942 air attacks 

Broome was attacked at least four times during World War II as part of the Japanese air raids on Australia. The worst attack in terms of loss of life was an air raid on 3 March 1942 in which at least 86 people (mostly civilian refugees from the Dutch East Indies) were killed, making it the second deadliest Japanese attack on Australia after the bombing of Darwin. Twenty-two aircraft were destroyed, most of them flying boats, the remains of which can still be seen in the harbour at low tide.

1950s to 2000s
In 1950, Broome was the setting for Arthur Upfield's novel The Widows of Broome, his 12th novel featuring Detective Inspector Napoleon Bonaparte ("Bony").

Dinosaur footprints dated as Early Cretaceous in age (approximately 130 million years ago) were discovered  out to sea at Gantheaume Point in the 1960s. The tracks can be seen only during very low tide. In 1996, some of the prints were cut from the ground and stolen, but have since been recovered.

Broome entered into a sister city agreement with Taiji, Japan in 1981 as historic ties between the two towns date back to the early 1900s, when Japan became instrumental in laying the groundwork of Broome's pearling industry. The annual dolphin hunt in Taiji was the subject of the 2009 documentary The Cove, and sparked a unanimous decision by Broome's council, headed by Graeme Campbell, to end the relationship with Taiji if the dolphin hunt were to continue. The decision was reversed in October 2009.

2012 Save the Kimberley campaign
The Broome community led a campaign to protest against a proposal to industrialise the James Price Point outside Broome. The campaign has received ardent support from public figures such as John Butler, Missy Higgins, Clare Bowditch and former leader of the Australian Greens, Dr Bob Brown. A concert for the campaign was held on 5 October 2012 at Federation Square in Melbourne and was attended by approximately 6,000 people. A long term protest camp operated at James Price Point. One of the campaign points was to protect the significant 'dinosaur highway' of dinosaur tracks that are found in the intertidal zone outside Broome. The campaign has since remained a divisive topic amongst locals, with many blaming the 'no' decision for the slow economic growth that characterises the region.

Palaeontological significance
Fossilised Megalosauropus broomensis dinosaur footprints dated as early Cretaceous in age are  out to sea at Gantheaume Point. The fossil trackway can be viewed during very low tide. Plant fossils are preserved extensively in the Broome Sandstone at Gantheaume Point and in coastal exposures further north.

Pearling industry 

The town has a history based around the exploits of the men and women who developed the pearling industry, starting with the harvesting of oysters for mother of pearl in the 1880s to the large present-day cultured pearl farming enterprises.

At first, Indigenous people, especially women and girls, were forced to dive for pearls by European pearlers, and many died working in the industry. Report of abuses in the early days of pearling led to legislation in 1871 and 1875 regulating native labour and prohibiting the use of women as divers. Asians, especially Japanese, excelled at pearl diving, with many of them becoming valued citizens in the town. Indeed, many  people with Japanese names thrive in the community. Pearling was a dangerous and sometimes deadly occupation and the town's Japanese cemetery is the resting place of 919 Japanese divers who lost their lives working in the industry.

Each year Broome celebrates the fusion of different cultures brought about by the pearling industry in an annual cultural festival called Shinju Matsuri (Japanese for "festival of the pearl").

In 2010, the Shire of Broome and Kimberley commissioned a Memorial to the Indigenous Female Pearl Divers. In April 2019, the skeletons of 14 Yawuru and Karajarri people which had been sold by a wealthy Broome pearler to a museum in Dresden in 1894 were brought home. The remains, which had been stored in the Grassi Museum of Ethnology in Leipzig, showed signs of head wounds and malnutrition, a reflection of the poor conditions endured by Aboriginal people forced to work on the pearling boats. , the remains are being stored in Perth until facilities have been built to accommodate them in Broome.

Population
 Aboriginal and Torres Strait Islander people made up 23.4% of the population. 
 70.6% of people were born in Australia. The next most common countries of birth were England 2.9%, New Zealand 1.9% and the Philippines 1.5%.   
 74.1% of people only spoke English at home. 
 The most common responses for religion were No Religion 47.0% and Catholic 21.4%.

Climate
Under the Köppen climate classification, Broome has a hot semi-arid climate (BSh), being a little too dry to be classified as a tropical savanna climate (Aw); like most parts of the Australian tropics, it has two seasons: a dry season and a wet season. Broome observes an average of 48.4 days a year that record measurable precipitation. According to the indigenous Yawuru calendar, there are six seasons.

Broome is susceptible to tropical cyclones and these, along with the equally unpredictable nature of summer thunderstorms, play a large part in the erratic nature of the rainfall. For instance, in January 1922, Broome Post Office recorded just  of rainfall while in the same month of 2018, the airport received .

Education
Broome contains six schools: five government, Broome Primary School, Broome North Primary School in the northern suburb of Bilingurr, Cable Beach Primary School in Cable Beach, Roebuck Primary School in the northern suburb of Djugun, and Broome Senior High School; and St Mary's College, a Catholic K–12 school.

Sport and recreation

Broome hosts a lawn bowling club and a golf club. The town has four Australian rules football clubs; Broome Bulls Football Club (established 1949) the Broome Saints, Towns and Cable Beach all competing in the West Kimberley Football Association with games played at Haynes Oval.

Four soccer clubs compete in the local Broome Soccer Association's BLiga competition each dry season. FC Meatworks, Pearlers, Racing G, and Broome Town field sides across men's and women's divisions.

Broome is considered to be among the best places in the world to catch sailfish.

Culture and entertainment 
Broome is home to the Sun Picture Garden, the oldest operating open-air cinema in the world.

Marrugeku is a dance company led by co-artistic directors choreographer/dancer Dalisa Pigram and director/dramaturg Rachael Swain, who have worked together for 23 years. The company has Indigenous and non-Indigenous Australians working together to create new dance performances, and works from two bases, one in Broome and the other at Carriageworks in Sydney.

Transport
Broome International Airport is the regional air hub of northwestern Western Australia and is considered the tourism gateway to the Horizontal Falls and the whole Kimberley region.

The Broome Tramway was an industrial tramway used to convey goods between Mangrove Point and the town centre from 1898 until the 1960s.

Media
Since 1992 Broome has been home to a local community newspaper, the Broome Advertiser, published each Thursday, part of the Seven West Media group. Previously Broome had a Saturday weekly newspaper, published from 1912 to 1930, The Nor-West Echo, the successor to the Broome Chronicle and Nor'West Advertiser (1908–1912).

Locally, television stations available include GWN7, WIN, Nine, ABC, SBS and Goolarri Media. GWN7 broadcasts a half-hour news program for regional WA, GWN7 News, at 5:30pm weeknights; GWN7 has a district newsroom covering Broome and surrounding areas based in the town.

Crocodile park

It was established in 1983 by the wildlife documentary maker Malcolm Douglas, and holds 30 adult crocodiles that have been captured in the wild after threatening humans. The park is home to Fatso, a saltwater crocodile who on 12 July 2010 bit a Melbourne man, Michael Newman, who climbed into his enclosure.

References

General references

External links

 
 Broome Visitor Centre
 Broome Football History
 'Barefoot and Brilliant' Archived in the National Library of Australia
 Broome Environment, Flora and Fauna
 Broome - Tourism Australia

 
Port cities and towns of the Indian Ocean
Port cities in Western Australia
Kimberley (Western Australia)
Coastal towns in Western Australia
1883 establishments in Australia